Aaron Ruben (March 1, 1914 – January 30, 2010) was an American television director and producer known for The Andy Griffith Show (1960), Gomer Pyle, U.S.M.C. (1964), and Sanford and Son (1972).

Early life

Ruben was born in Chicago, Illinois, the son of Polish Jewish immigrants. He grew up on the West Side of Chicago and attended Lewis Institute but did not graduate. He was involved in theater in Chicago after leaving college. After service in the military he worked for studios and wrote for radio programs including those of Dinah Shore, George Burns and Gracie Allen, and Fred Allen. He co-wrote Milton Berle's 1947-48 radio series with Nat Hiken.

Television career
Ruben started his TV producing and directing career in 1954 when he directed the TV series Caesar's Hour (1954). He then directed eleven episodes of The Phil Silvers Show between 1957 and 1959  along with Silvers' CBS TV special, Keep in Step (1959). He later produced The Andy Griffith Show (1960), working on that series for five seasons as producer, writer and story consultant. 

He went on to create the Andy Griffith spin-off Gomer Pyle, U.S.M.C. (1964), which turned out to be his only TV creation. Other credits include The Headmaster (1970), Sanford and Son (1972), C.P.O. Sharkey (1976) and Teachers Only (1982). Aaron Ruben last did a voiceover in the videogame Buick Berle, 1954 (1995). In 2003, Ruben won the Writers Guild of America, West's Valentine Davies Award for public service, for his work on behalf of abused children.

Film
Ruben co-wrote and co-produced (with Carl Reiner) a 1969 film about the silent-movie era, The Comic, starring Dick Van Dyke.

Death
Ruben was married to actress Maureen Arthur. He died from pneumonia on January 30, 2010, at his home in Beverly Hills, California, aged 95.

Primetime Emmy Award Nominations
Outstanding New Series: Sanford and Son - Shared with Bud Yorkin, 1972
Outstanding Series - Comedy: Sanford and Son - Shared with Bud Yorkin, 1972
Outstanding Comedy Series: Sanford and Son - Shared with Bud Yorkin, 1973

References

External links
 
 
 
 

1914 births
2010 deaths
20th-century American Jews
American television directors
Television producers from Illinois
American television writers
American male television writers
Deaths from pneumonia in California
Artists from Chicago
Screenwriters from Illinois
21st-century American Jews